The Dallas Scottish Rite Temple is a monumental structure in the Farmers Market District of downtown Dallas, Texas. Constructed in 1913 as an official headquarters for use by the Scottish Rite Masons and other local Masonic lodges, it is a fine example of early 20th century Beaux Arts Classical architecture in Texas. The structure, a Dallas Landmark and Recorded Texas Historic Landmark, is listed on the National Register of Historic Places and is a contributing property in the Harwood Street Historic District.

Photo gallery

See also

National Register of Historic Places listings in Dallas County, Texas
Recorded Texas Historic Landmarks in Dallas County
List of Dallas Landmarks

References

External links

Masonic buildings completed in 1913
Buildings and structures in Dallas
Masonic buildings in Texas
National Register of Historic Places in Dallas
Recorded Texas Historic Landmarks
Dallas Landmarks
Clubhouses on the National Register of Historic Places in Texas
1913 establishments in Texas